Harrison Memorial may refer to the following:

Awards
Edward Harrison Memorial Prize
Harrison-Meldola Memorial Prizes

Buildings and structures
Benjamin Harrison Memorial Bridge near Hopewell, Virginia
William Henry Harrison Tomb State Memorial near North Bend, Ohio